Magdalena may refer to:

 Magdalena (given name), a given name derived from Mary Magdalene (including a list of people with the name)

Entertainment
 Magdalena (comics), an American comic book superheroine
 Magdalena (film), a 1920 Czechoslovak film
 Magdalena (Philippine TV series), a 2012 Philippine drama series
 Magdalena (Mexican TV series), Mexican telenovela
 Magdalena (novel), a Czech novel by Josef Svatopluk Machar

Music
 Magdalena: a Musical Adventure, a 1948 folk operetta by Heitor Villa-Lobos
 Magdalena, a 1983 album by Freddie Aguilar, or the title song
 "Magdalena", a song by Brandon Flowers from Flamingo, 2010
 "Magdalena", a song by David Gray from Sell, Sell, Sell, 1996
 "Magdalena", a song by dEUS from The Ideal Crash, 1999
 "Magdalena", a song by Donny Hathaway from Extension of a Man, 1973
 "Magdalena", a song by the Mothers of Invention from Just Another Band from L.A., 1972
 "Magdalena", a song by A Perfect Circle from Mer de Noms, 2000
 "Magdalena", a song by Willie Nile from House of a Thousand Guitars, 2009

Places

Argentina
Magdalena, Buenos Aires, the district capital of Magdalena Partido in Buenos Aires Province
Magdalena Partido, partido located in the north eastern part of Buenos Aires Province

Bolivia
Magdalena, Beni, a municipal section

Chile
Magdalena Channel, channel joining the Strait of Magellan with Cockburn Channel
Magdalena Island, Aysén Region, island in southern Chile
Magdalena Island, Magallanes Region, small island in the Strait of Magellan

Colombia
Central Magdalena Province, a province in the Cundinamarca Department
Lower Magdalena Province, a province in the Cundinamarca Department
Magdalena Department, an administrative division (previously the State of Magdalena, during the United States of Colombia period)
Magdalena Medio Antioquia, a subregion of the Antioquia Department
Magdalena River, the principal river of Colombia
Magdalena River Valley
Upper Magdalena Province, a province in the Cundinamarca Department

Ecuador
 La Magdalena, Quito, an electoral parish
 La Magdalena metro station

Honduras
Magdalena, Intibucá, a municipality

Mexico
 Magdalena Apasco
 Magdalena Bay, western coast of the Mexican state of Baja California Sur
 Magdalena Contreras, one of 16 boroughs into which Mexico's Federal District is divided
 Magdalena, Jalisco, municipality in the state of Jalisco, near Tequla
 Magdalena Jaltepec
 Magdalena de Kino, city in the state of Sonora
 Magdalena (municipality), whose seat is Magdalena de Kino
 Magdalena Municipality, Veracruz, municipality in Veracruz
 Isla Magdalena (Baja California Sur), island off the Pacific Ocean coast of the Mexican state of Baja California Sur

Peru
Magdalena del Mar, district of the Lima Province in Peru
Magdalena Vieja, ancient name of Pueblo Libre district in Lima Province in Peru
Magdalena District, Cajamarca, district of the province Cajamarca in Peru
Magdalena District, Chachapoyas, in the province of Chachapoyas, Peru

Philippines
Magdalena, Laguna, a municipality

Slovenia
Magdalena District, Maribor, a suburb of Maribor

Spain
Magdalena Peninsula, peninsula along the north coast of Spain

Tobago
Magdalena, the original name of the island of Tobago

United States
Magdalena, New Mexico
Magdalena Mountains, west-central New Mexico
Magdalena National Forest, New Mexico

Ships
Magdalena (1871), a Norwegian seal catcher 1871-1906
, a number of ships with this name
, a number of ships with this name

Other uses
 La Magdalena, Jaén, a church in Andalucia, Spain
 Church of la Magdalena (Torrelaguna), a church in Spain
 Convento de la Magdalena, a former convent, now a hotel, near Antequera, Province of Málaga, Spain
 Palacio de la Magdalena, a palace in Santander, Cantabria, Spain
Magdalena, a type of Spanish muffin
318 Magdalena, large Main belt asteroid
Magdalena alpine, a member of the subfamily Satyrinae of the family Nymphalidae.

See also 
Anna Magdalena, a 1998 Hong Kong film

 Magdalene (disambiguation)
 Maddalena (disambiguation)